Wustrower Dumme is a river of the German states Saxony-Anhalt and Lower Saxony.

Course 
The Dumme runs through the border region between Altmark in the south and Wendland in the north; in places it forms the border river between Lower Saxony and Saxony-Anhalt. During its course it passes Bergen an der Dumme, before discharging into the northward-flowing Jeetzel near Wustrow, hence the first part of the name.

See also 
 Salzwedeler Dumme
 List of rivers of Lower Saxony
 List of rivers of Saxony-Anhalt

References

Rivers of Lower Saxony
Rivers of Saxony-Anhalt
Rivers of Germany